Waterkloof Glen is a suburb of the city of Pretoria, South Africa. Located to the east of Waterkloof in a leafy, established area that is home to some good real estate.

See also
 The Glen High School, a public, English medium High School situated here.

References

Suburbs of Pretoria